The following is a partial list of the "E" codes for Medical Subject Headings (MeSH), as defined by the United States National Library of Medicine (NLM).

This list continues the information at List of MeSH codes (E05). Codes following these are found at List of MeSH codes (E07). For other MeSH codes, see List of MeSH codes.

The source for this content is the set of 2006 MeSH Trees from the NLM.

– dentistry

– air abrasion, dental

– anesthesia, dental
  – hypnosis, dental

– dental bonding
  – cementation
  – dental etching
  – acid etching, dental

– dental care
  – dental care for aged
  – dental care for children
  – dental care for chronically ill
  – dental care for disabled

– dental debonding

– dental equipment
  – dental articulators
  – dental devices, home care
  – dental high-speed equipment
  – dental instruments
  – matrix bands
  – rubber dams

– dental health surveys
  – dental plaque index
  – dmf index
  – oral hygiene index
  – periodontal index

– dental high-speed technique

– dental implantation
  – dental implantation, endosseous
  – blade implantation
  – dental implantation, endosseous, endodontic
  – dental implantation, subperiosteal

– dental models

– dental occlusion
  – bite force
  – dental occlusion, balanced
  – dental occlusion, centric
  – vertical dimension

– dental pins

– dental polishing

– dental stress analysis

– dentistry, operative
  – crown lengthening
  – dental cavity lining
  – dental restoration failure
  – dental restoration, permanent
  – crowns
  – post and core technique
  – inlays
  – marginal adaptation (dentistry)
  – dental restoration, temporary
  – crowns
  – post and core technique

– diagnosis, oral
  – dental caries activity tests
  – dental pulp test
  – photography, dental
  – radiography, dental
  – age determination by teeth
  – radiography, bitewing
  – radiography, dental, digital
  – radiography, panoramic
  – sialography

– electrogalvanism, intraoral

– endodontics
  – apicoectomy
  – dental implantation, endosseous, endodontic
  – dental pulp capping
  – pulpectomy
  – pulpotomy
  – root canal therapy
  – dental pulp devitalization
  – root canal obturation
  – retrograde obturation
  – root canal preparation
  – tooth replantation

– esthetics, dental
  – enamel microabrasion
  – tooth bleaching

– infection control, dental

– jaw relation record
  – centric relation

– mouth rehabilitation

– odontometry

– oral medicine

– oral surgical procedures
  – apicoectomy
  – gingivectomy
  – gingivoplasty
  – glossectomy
  – jaw fixation techniques
  – mandibular advancement
  – maxillofacial prosthesis implantation
  – mandibular prosthesis implantation
  – oral surgical procedures, preprosthetic
  – alveolar ridge augmentation
  – alveolectomy
  – alveoloplasty
  – dental implantation
  – dental implantation, endosseous
  – blade implantation
  – dental implantation, endosseous, endodontic
  – dental implantation, subperiosteal
  – vestibuloplasty
  – osteotomy, le fort
  – tooth extraction
  – serial extraction
  – tooth replantation

– orthodontics
  – mandibular advancement
  – orthodontic anchorage procedures
  – orthodontic appliance design
  – orthodontic appliances
  – occlusal splints
  – orthodontic appliances, functional
  – activator appliances
  – orthodontic appliances, removable
  – activator appliances
  – extraoral traction appliances
  – orthodontic brackets
  – orthodontic retainers
  – orthodontic wires
  – orthodontics, corrective
  – crown lengthening
  – occlusal adjustment
  – orthodontic extrusion
  – orthodontic space closure
  – palatal expansion technique
  – tooth movement
  – orthodontics, interceptive
  – serial extraction
  – orthodontics, preventive
  – space maintenance

– pathology, oral

– periodontics
  – dental prophylaxis
  – dental scaling
  – root planing
  – gingivectomy
  – gingivoplasty
  – guided tissue regeneration, periodontal
  – periodontal dressings
  – periodontal index
  – periodontal prosthesis
  – periodontal splints
  – subgingival curettage
  – root planing

– preventive dentistry
  – dental prophylaxis
  – dental scaling
  – root planing
  – fluoridation
  – mouth protectors
  – oral hygiene
  – dental devices, home care
  – toothbrushing

– prosthodontics
  – dental casting technique
  – dental implantation
  – dental implantation, endosseous
  – blade implantation
  – dental implantation, endosseous, endodontic
  – dental implantation, subperiosteal
  – dental prosthesis
  – crowns
  – post and core technique
  – dental abutments
  – dental clasps
  – dental implants
  – dental implants, single-tooth
  – dental prosthesis design
  – dental prosthesis, implant-supported
  – dental prosthesis repair
  – dental prosthesis retention
  – dental restoration failure
  – dental restoration, permanent
  – crowns
  – post and core technique
  – dental restoration wear
  – dental veneers
  – inlays
  – dental restoration, temporary
  – dental veneers
  – dentures
  – denture bases
  – denture, complete
  – denture, complete, immediate
  – denture, complete, lower
  – denture, complete, upper
  – denture design
  – denture liners
  – denture, overlay
  – denture, partial
  – denture, partial, fixed
  – denture, partial, fixed, resin-bonded
  – denture, partial, immediate
  – denture, partial, removable
  – denture, partial, temporary
  – denture precision attachment
  – denture rebasing
  – denture repair
  – denture retention
  – inlays
  – palatal obturators
  – tooth, artificial
  – tissue conditioning (dental)

– surgery, oral

– technology, dental
  – dental casting technique
  – dental impression technique
  – dental prosthesis design
  – dental prosthesis repair
  – dental soldering
  – denture design
  – denture identification marking
  – denture rebasing
  – denture repair
  – orthodontic appliance design

– tooth preparation
  – dental cavity preparation
  – root canal preparation
  – tooth preparation, prosthodontic

– tooth remineralization

The list continues at List of MeSH codes (E07).

E06